North Wilmurt is a hamlet located on Farr Road in the town of Ohio in Herkimer County, New York, United States. Twin Lakes Stream flows west through the hamlet.

References

Hamlets in Herkimer County, New York
Hamlets in New York (state)